The 2017 Lamar Hunt U.S. Open Cup was the 104th edition of the oldest ongoing competition in American soccer.

FC Dallas entered the competition as the defending champions, but were eliminated in the quarterfinals by Sporting Kansas City.  First round matchups were announced April 12, and matches began May 9.

The cash prize amounts were the same as those in the 2016 tournament, with the champion receiving $250,000 and the runner-up $60,000. The team from each lower division that advanced the furthest received $15,000.

Qualification 

Qualification for the Open Cup began in September 2016 with lower league play-in ties. NPSL team Minneapolis City SC was disqualified before the start of the tournament after the club changed leagues during the qualification process.

 $: Winner of $15,000 bonus for advancing the furthest in the competition from their respective divisions. 
 $$: Winner of $60,000 for being the runner-up in the competition.
 $$$: Winner of $250,000 for winning the competition.

Brackets 
Host team listed firstBold = winner* = after extra time, = penalty shootout score

Match details 

All times local to game site

First round
Draw announced May 18.

Second round
Draw announced April 12.

Third round
Draw announced May 12.

Fourth round
Draw announced May 18.

Round of 16
Draw announced June 15.

Quarterfinals

Semifinals

Final

Top goalscorers

References

External links 

 The Cup.us – Full Coverage of the U.S. Open Cup
 Lamar Hunt U.S. Open Cup – U.S. Soccer

 
U.S. Open Cup
U.S. Open Cup